Pino Caballero Gil (born November 29, 1968) is a Spanish scientist. She is a professor in Computer Science and Artificial Intelligence at the University of La Laguna (ULL) where she coordinates the CryptULL cryptology research group.

Biography
She received her degree in mathematics from the ULL in 1990, and her Ph.D. from the same university in 1995. She is a professor in Computer Science and Artificial Intelligence since 2015. Her research focuses on cryptography, cryptanalysis, cryptographic protocols, wireless communications security, pseudorandom number generator, strong authentication, and secure mobile applications.

Since 1998, she coordinates the CryptULL group of research in cryptology at ULL. She has participated in 47 national and international research projects. Caballero is a founding member of the Spanish Network of Excellence on Cybersecurity Research.

In 2019, she was an unsuccessful candidate for rector at ULL. She gave a plenary lecture during Spanish Meeting on Cryptology and Information Security (RECSI) 2022 at the University of Cantabria.

Awards and honours
 In 2017, she received the Award of the Instituto Universitario de Estudios de la Mujer, ULL.
 In 1998, she received the Premio . 
 She also received the "Proyecto Empresarial" Award from the Fyde-.

References

External links
 Pino Caballero Gil at TEDxLaLaguna, 20 November 2017
 Pino Caballero Gil at QPH Radio, 6 January 2022

1968 births
Living people
University of La Laguna alumni
Spanish computer scientists
Academic staff of the University of La Laguna
People from Las Palmas
Artificial intelligence researchers